Frank Hickley (14 December 1895 �; 28 October 1972) was an English cricketer. Hickley was a right-handed batsman whose bowling style is unknown. He was born at Leicester, Leicestershire.

Hickley made two first-class appearances for Leicestershire in the 1921 County Championship against Gloucestershire and Derbyshire. He scored 34 runs in his two matches at an average of 11.33, with a high score of 27. He also took a single wicket with the ball.

He died at the city of his birth on 28 October 1972.

References

External links
 Frank Hickley at ESPNcricinfo
 Frank Hickley at CricketArchive

1895 births
1972 deaths
Cricketers from Leicester
English cricketers
Leicestershire cricketers